Carenum decorum is a species of ground beetle in the subfamily Scaritinae. It was described by Sloane in 1888.

References

decorum
Beetles described in 1888